Lawder's bent-toed gecko (Cyrtodactylus lawderanus) is a species of gecko, a lizard in the family Gekkonidae. The species is endemic to northern India (western Himalayas, Kumaon). Its type locality is "Kumaon", restricted to Almora by Malcolm Arthur Smith. It is named after Mr. A. Lawder who collected the holotype. His identity is not known for sure, but he is likely to have been A.W. Lawder who was a member of the Geological Society of London, as was Ferdinand Stoliczka who described the species. It is sometimes placed in the genus Cyrtopodion.

Description
The body of C. lawderanus is rather slender and elongate, depressed, and covered above with numerous granules intermixed with small roundish tubercles. The upper side of the head is equally granular, with the granular scales being somewhat larger on the snout. The rostral area is large, and broad, with the nostril pierced between the rostral, the first labial, and two nasals. It has 9 upper and 8 lower labials. The mental area is triangular, partially wedged in between two elongate chin-shields, forming a suture below it. Each of the chin-shields is followed along the labials by three other somewhat rounded shields. the ear-opening is small and rounded. Ventral scales are small. Two pairs of preanal pores occur in the male, are close together, and form an angle. General colour above is greyish brown, very densely marbled and spotted with dark brown, with some indistinct undulating, whitish cross bands on the body, and margined on the anterior edges with blackish brown. A somewhat indistinct dark band runs from the nostril through the eye to the ear.  The front and hind edges of the eye white 5 labials are spotted and speckled with brown.  Below is whitish. The length of body is nearly 2 inches.

References

Further reading
Annandale N (1913). "Some new and interesting Batrachia and Lizards from India, Ceylon and Borneo". Records of the Indian Museum 9: 301–307. (Alsophylax himalayensis, new species, pp. 305–306 + Plate XV, figures 1, 1a, 1b, 1c).
Smith MA (1935). The Fauna of British India, Including Ceylon and Burma. Reptilia and Amphibia. Vol. II.—Sauria. London: Secretary of State for India in Council. (Taylor and Francis, printers). xiii + 440 pp. + Plate I + 2 maps. (Gymnodactylus lawderanus, pp. 58–59, Figure 18).
Stoliczka F (1871). "Notes on new or little known Indian lizards". Proc. Asiatic Soc. Bengal (Calcutta) 1871: 192–195. (Gymnodactylus lawderanus, new species, p. 194).

Cyrtodactylus
Taxa named by Ferdinand Stoliczka
Reptiles described in 1871
Reptiles of India
Endemic fauna of India